Events from the year 1535 in Ireland.

Incumbent
Lord: Henry VIII

Events
March – Silken Thomas' stronghold at Maynooth, County Kildare, is taken by an English force under Sir William Skeffington, in his absence.
July – Lord Leonard Grey arrives from England as Lord Deputy of Ireland. 
August – Thomas FitzGerald, 10th Earl of Kildare (Silken Thomas) surrenders.
October – Silken Thomas is sent as a prisoner to the Tower of London.

Births

Deaths

References

 
1530s in Ireland
Ireland
Years of the 16th century in Ireland